The 45th Academy Awards were presented Tuesday, March 27, 1973, at the Dorothy Chandler Pavilion in Los Angeles, California, honoring the best films of 1972. The ceremonies were presided over by Carol Burnett, Michael Caine, Charlton Heston, and Rock Hudson.

The ceremony was marked by Marlon Brando's boycott of the Oscars and his sending of Sacheen Littlefeather to explain why he couldn't show up to collect his Best Actor award for The Godfather, and by Charlie Chaplin's only competitive Oscar win for Best Original Dramatic Score for his 20-year-old film Limelight, which was eligible because it did not screen in Los Angeles until 1972. Chaplin had received honorary Academy Awards in 1929 and 1972.

Cabaret, Bob Fosse's adaptation of the Broadway stage musical, set a record for the most Oscars won without winning Best Picture. Best Picture winner The Godfather  received only three Academy Awards.

This year was the first time that two African American women received nominations for Best Actress.

This was also the first year when all the Oscar winners were brought out on stage at the end of the ceremony. The show drew a television audience of  viewers.

Winners and nominees

Awards 
Nominees were announced on February 12, 1973. Winners are listed first in boldface.

Honorary Academy Awards

Special Achievement Award 
 L. B. Abbott and A. D. Flowers for the visual effects of The Poseidon Adventure

Academy Honorary Award 
 Charles S. Boren
 Edward G. Robinson

Films with multiple nominations and awards 

The following 15 films received multiple nominations.
 10 nominations: Cabaret and The Godfather
 9 nominations: The Poseidon Adventure
 5 nominations: Lady Sings the Blues
 4 nominations: The Emigrants, Sleuth, Sounder and Travels with My Aunt
 3 nominations: Butterflies Are Free, Deliverance and Young Winston
 2 nominations: The Candidate, The Discreet Charm of the Bourgeoisie, The Heartbreak Kid and Pete 'n' Tillie
A Was also nominated in the previous year for Best Foreign Language Film.

The following three films received multiple awards.
 8 wins: Cabaret
 3 wins: The Godfather
 2 wins: The Poseidon Adventure

Eligibility controversies 
It was initially announced, on February 12, 1973, that The Godfather received 11 nominations, more than any other film that year. This was reduced to 10 nominations (tied with Cabaret for the most) after a new vote by the Academy's music branch, following a controversy over whether Nino Rota's score for The Godfather was eligible for the nomination it received. For the re-balloting, members of the music branch chose from six films: The Godfather and the five films that had been on the shortlist for best original dramatic score but did not get nominated. John Addison's score for Sleuth won this new vote, and thus replaced Rota's score on the official list of nominees. The controversy arose, according to Academy President Daniel Taradash, because the love theme in The Godfather had previously been used by Rota in Fortunella, an Italian movie from several years earlier.

The nominations in the category of Best Original Song were not announced in February with the rest of the nominations, reportedly because of "a mixup in balloting". It was later reported that the Academy had been considering whether Curtis Mayfield's song "Freddie's Dead" from the film Super Fly should be eligible. The song was ruled ineligible for a nomination because its lyrics were not sung in the film. (The song was released as a single with lyrics, but the version in the film was an instrumental.) Academy governor John Green was quoted as saying: "Times have changed. In the old days, Hollywood made 30 or 40 musicals a year, and there were plenty of songs to choose from. Now there are hardly any, and most of the eligible songs are themes. Both the lyric and the music must be heard on the sound track to be eligible."

Sacheen Littlefeather appearance 

Sacheen Littlefeather was an American actress, model, and activist of Native American civil rights who Marlon Brando chose to represent him at the ceremony. Littlefeather took the stage and spoke on Brando's behalf as a form of protest, representing Native Americans. However, years later, it was discovered that Littlefeather had grossly misrepresented her ancestry throughout her life, by saying she was Native American when in reality she was not. Instead, her family was of Mexican ancestry with no tribal ties.

Presenters and performers 
The following individuals, listed in order of appearance, presented awards or performed musical numbers. Notably, Charlton Heston was late for his role presenting the voting rules, reportedly due to a flat tire. Clint Eastwood, who was slated to present for Best Picture, was asked to fill in. Heston's written dialogue leaned heavily on his role in the movie The Ten Commandments, leading Eastwood to quip “Come on, flip the card, man. This isn’t my bag.” Eastwood also famously said on filling in at the last minute, "...They pick the guy who hasn’t said but three lines in 12 movies to substitute for him [Heston]”. Heston arrived part of the way through the bit, allowing Eastwood to escape.

Presenters

Performers

See also 
 Sacheen Littlefeather
 30th Golden Globe Awards
 1972 in film
 15th Grammy Awards
 24th Primetime Emmy Awards
 25th Primetime Emmy Awards
 26th British Academy Film Awards
 27th Tony Awards

References 

Academy Awards ceremonies
1972 film awards
1973 in Los Angeles
1973 in American cinema
March 1973 events in the United States
Television shows directed by Marty Pasetta